Asolene pulchella is a species of freshwater snail, an aquatic gastropod mollusk in the family Ampullariidae, the apple snails and their allies.

Distribution 
The distribution of Asolene pulchella includes:
 Argentina
 Bolivia
 Uruguay

References

External links 

Ampullariidae
Gastropods described in 1839